Kadiolo Cercle is an administrative subdivision of the Sikasso Region of southern Mali. The administrative center (chef-lieu) is the town of Kadiolo.

The cercle is divided into nine rural communes:

Diou
Dioumaténé
Fourou
Kadiolo
Kaï
Loulouni
Misséni
Nimbougou
Zégoua

References

External links
.

Cercles of Mali
Sikasso Region